The 2021 Belgorod Oblast gubernatorial election took place on 17–19 September 2021, on common election day, coinciding with election to the State Duma. Acting Governor Vyacheslav Gladkov was elected for his first full term.

Background
On 22 September 2020 longtime Governor Yevgeny Savchenko was elected to the Federation Council by the Belgorod Oblast Duma. He resigned from the governorship which he held from 1993 being the longest-serving Russian Governor. He won his last gubernatorial election in 2017 with 69.29% of the vote.

After Savchenko's resignation First Vice Governor Denis Butsayev became acting Governor of Belgorod Oblast. Butsayev's position of First Vice Governor was created several hours before Savchenko announced his resignation with the sole intent of Butsayev to take the governorship. However, Denis Butsayev was not confirmed as acting Governor by the President, which created speculations about appointment of another acting Governor. Among the considered candidates was federal Minister of Transport Yevgeny Dietrich (he left the Russian Government on 9 November). On 18 November 2020 President Vladimir Putin appointed Vice Governor of Stavropol Krai Vyacheslav Gladkov as acting Governor of Belgorod Oblast. Gladkov previously held the positions of Vice Governor of Sevastopol (2016–2018) and Mayor of ZATO Zarechny (2009–2016).

It was reported that incumbent Senator from Belgorod Oblast and former Soviet Premier (1985–1991) Nikolay Ryzhkov won't be re-appointed to the Federation Council, however, he was nominated to the Federation Council by Vyacheslav Gladkov and later re-appointed.

Candidates
Only political parties can nominate candidates for gubernatorial election in Belgorod Oblast, self-nomination is not possible. However, candidate is not obliged to be a member of the nominating party. Candidate for Governor of Belgorod Oblast should be a Russian citizen and at least 30 years old. Candidates for Governor should not have a foreign citizenship or residence permit. Each candidate in order to be registered is required to collect at least 5% of signatures of members and heads of municipalities (106–111 signatures). Also gubernatorial candidates present 3 candidacies to the Federation Council and election winner later appoints one of the presented candidates.

Registered candidates
Vladimir Abelmazov (RPPSS), Member of Belgorod Oblast Duma
Vyacheslav Gladkov (United Russia), acting Governor of Belgorod Oblast, former Vice Governor of Stavropol Krai (2018–2020)
Yevgeny Dremov (LDPR), aide to State Duma member Aleksandr Starovoytov
Yury Osetrov (SR-ZP), former Member of Belgorod Oblast Duma (2015–2020)
Kirill Skachko (CPRF), Member of Belgorod City Council

Candidates for the Federation Council
Vladimir Abelmazov (RPPSS):
Vladimir Denisov, lawyer
Vladimir Zatsepin, pensioner
Sergey Milshin, "Burovik Gazproma" correspondent
Vyacheslav Gladkov (United Russia):
Olga Pavlova, Speaker of the Belgorod Oblast Duma
Nikolay Ryzhkov, incumbent Senator of the Federation Council
Aleksandr Shumeyko, Member of Belgorod Oblast Duma
Yevgeny Dremov (LDPR):
Sergey Barinov, coordinator of the LDPR Belgorod regional office
Konstantin Klimashevsky, Member of Belgorod Oblast Duma, 2017 gubernatorial candidate
Maksim Malyutin, director of LLP "NEFTEKHIM-Komplekt"
Yury Osetrov (SR-ZP):
Yury Vorobyev, director of private security company "Okhrannaya Sluzhba Bezopasnosti"
Oleg Korchagin, member of Stary Oskol Council of Deputies
Oksana Kuryambina, chief accountant at CJSC "AspektTsentr"
Kirill Skachko (CPRF):
Stanislav Panov, Member of Belgorod Oblast Duma, first secretary of the CPRF Belgorod Oblast Committee
Sergey Chumakov, general director of LLP "Transavtomatizatsiya"
Valery Shevlyakov, Member of Belgorod Oblast Duma

Finances
All sums are in rubles.

Results

|- style="background-color:#E9E9E9;text-align:center;"
! style="text-align:left;" colspan=2| Candidate
! style="text-align:left;"| Party
! width="75"|Votes
! width="30"|%
|-
| style="background-color:;"|
| style="text-align:left;"| Vyacheslav Gladkov (incumbent)
| style="text-align:left;"| United Russia
| 566,353
| 78.79
|-
| style="background-color:;"|
| style="text-align:left;"| Kirill Skachko
| style="text-align:left;"| Communist Party
| 71,430
| 9.94
|-
| style="background-color:;"|
| style="text-align:left;"| Yury Osetrov
| style="text-align:left;"| A Just Russia — For Truth
| 27,101
| 3.77
|-
| style="background-color:;"|
| style="text-align:left;"| Yevgeny Dremov
| style="text-align:left;"| Liberal Democratic Party
| 20,899
| 2.91
|-
| style="background-color:|
| style="text-align:left;"| Vladimir Abelmazov
| style="text-align:left;"| Party of Pensioners
| 20,828
| 2.90
|-
| style="text-align:left;" colspan="3"| Valid votes
| 706,611
| 98.30
|-
| style="text-align:left;" colspan="3"| Blank ballots
| 12,232
| 1.70
|- style="font-weight:bold"
| style="text-align:left;" colspan="3"| Total
| 718,843
| 100.00
|-
| style="background-color:#E9E9E9;" colspan="6"|
|-
| style="text-align:left;" colspan="3"| Turnout
| 718,843
| 58.57
|-
| style="text-align:left;" colspan="3"| Registered voters
| 1,227,252
| 100.00
|-
| colspan="5" style="background-color:#E9E9E9;"|
|- style="font-weight:bold"
| colspan="4" |Source:
|
|}

Incumbent Senator Nikolay Ryzhkov (Independent) was re-appointed to the Federation Council.

References

Belgorod Oblast
September 2021 events in Russia
Politics of Belgorod Oblast